Augusto Barcia (1926 in Santiago, Chile – 8 December 2001 in Santiago, Chile) was a painter from Chile.

References

Further reading
 Barcia by Barcia, 1998 Edición ATG

External links
Página dedicada al pintor, Augusto Barcia
Universidad de Chile, MAC
Art PicassoMio

1926 births
2001 deaths
20th-century Chilean painters
20th-century Chilean male artists
Chilean male painters